Ctenucha pohli is a moth of the family Erebidae. It is found in Brazil.

References

pohli
Moths described in 1921